Modou Birame N'Diaye (born 29 October 1996) is a Senegalese professional footballer who plays as a midfielder for Czech club Viktoria Plzeň.

Club career
N'Diaye began his career in his native Senegal with the club Douanes in 2014. In the summer of 2018, he moved to France with Evian Thonon in the French 6th division, and helped score the goal that earned them promotion to the Championnat National 3 on 2 June 2019. He transferred to the Czech National Football League club Silon Táborsko on 9 November 2020. In 2021, he transferred to the Czech First League side Viktoria Plzeň, and joined Karviná for the remainder of the 2021-22 season. He returned to Viktoria Plzeň in the summer of 2022, and participated in the UEFA Champions League that campaign.

References

External links
 
 

1996 births
Living people
People from Kaolack
Senegalese footballers
Association football midfielders
AS Douanes (Senegal) players
Czech First League players
Czech National Football League players
Thonon Evian Grand Genève F.C. players
FC Silon Táborsko players
FC Viktoria Plzeň players
MFK Karviná players
Senegalese expatriate footballers
Senegalese expatriate sportspeople in the Czech Republic
Expatriate footballers in the Czech Republic